Rudzāti Parish is an administrative unit of Līvāni Municipality in the Latgale region of Latvia. Prior to the 2009 administrative reforms it was part of Preiļi District.

Towns, villages and settlements of Rudzāti Parish 
Rudzāti

References

External links 
 

Parishes of Latvia
Līvāni Municipality
Latgale